Tasti D-Lite is a New York-based fast food company and operates a system of franchise chain stores which are predominantly located in New York state, although the company's corporate headquarters are now in Arizona.

Overview
Tasti D-Lite was acquired in 2007 by NY-based private equity group SPG Partners LLC  and announced that James H. Amos, one of the firm's operating partners, will serve as Chief Executive Officer of Tasti D-Lite.  The new company would be headquartered in Franklin, Tennessee.

A redesigned website was launched in 2007 listing nutritional information for over 100 flavors.
Tasti D-Lite announced in 2008 that it will begin a franchise offering to facilitate the growth of the brand to markets both domestic and international. Subsequently, a majority of the original licensed stores signed agreements to convert to the franchise model. Also in 2008, the first international development agreement was signed for South Korea.

In June 2015, Quick-Service Restaurant Franchisor Kahala Brands purchased Tasti D-Lite along with smoothie chain Planet Smoothie. Kahala Brands is owned by the Serruya family of Canada and is the franchisor of about a dozen fast food, treat and sandwich chains such as Blimpie and Cold Stone Creamery. Together, the 128 Tasti D-Lite and Planet Smoothie locations will now be run from the Kahala Brands corporate headquarters in Scottsdale, Arizona.

Criticism
In 2002, published studies  found that the company may have greatly exaggerated claims of its product's healthfulness. Tasti D-Lite subsequently implemented an overrun compliance program and settled the nutritional claims matter with the New York City Department of Consumer Affairs.

In popular culture

In 2002, Tasti D-Lite was mentioned in episodes of HBO’s Sex and the City season 4 episode 15 , when Miranda and Carrie go shopping for Carrie’s wedding dress. The brand was also mentioned in The Apprentice season 2 episode 18 . The brand was also mentioned in episodes of 30 Rock. Additionally, it is mentioned in Lena Dunham’s book of essays Not That Kind of Girl, in the chapter titled "Is This Even Real?"

See also
 List of frozen dessert brands

References

External links
 

Brand name frozen desserts
Companies based in Scottsdale, Arizona
Fast-food chains of the United States
Fast-food franchises
Kahala Brands
Regional restaurant chains in the United States
Restaurants established in 1987
1987 establishments in New York City
Restaurants in Arizona
Restaurants in New York (state)
Restaurants in Tennessee
2015 mergers and acquisitions